Rhyephenes is a genus of beetles in the family Curculionidae (true weevils) natural to Chile and neighboring mountains in the Argentine Andes, from the Coquimbo Region in the north to Magallanes Region in the south. In Spanish it is known by the common name burrito and caballito de palo.

Description
Its elytra are fused, hence it cannot fly. The body is mostly black, with most species showing two white or orange spots in the elytra, and some showing a reddish hue in the thorax and legs.

Taxonomy
Rhyephenes contains the following species:
 Rhyephenes gayi
 Rhyephenes maillei
 Rhyephenes squamiger
 Rhyephenes humeralis
 Rhyephenes lateralis
 Rhyephenes clathratus
 Rhyephenes goureaui

References

 Invasive.org
 nublenaturaleza

Curculionidae
Beetles of South America
Insects described in 1837
Taxa named by Carl Johan Schönherr